Evelyne Pinard, born Osterhold, (May 15, 1923 – September 4, 2014) was French athlete who specialised in the javelin and who was selected 24 times for French national teams from 1947 to 1957. She was ten times champion of France. She was born in Strasbourg.

References
Profile of Évelyne Pinard 

French female javelin throwers
1923 births
2014 deaths